Kuprin, female Kuprina is a Russian surname. Notable people with the surname include:

Aleksandr Kuprin (1870–1938), Russian writer
Alexander V. Kuprin (1880–1960), Russian painter
Ksenia Kuprina

See also
3618 Kuprin, a small object in the asteroid belt

Russian-language surnames